Leng Ngeth (1900 – 1975) was a Cambodian politician who served as the prime minister of Cambodia from January to October 1955. From 1958 to 1962 he was ambassador in Beijing.

References

1900 births
1975 deaths
20th-century Cambodian politicians 
Cambodian diplomats 
People executed by the Khmer Rouge 
Democratic Party (Cambodia) politicians
Prime Ministers of Cambodia
People from Phnom Penh
Ambassadors of Cambodia to China